Amr Nabil (born 15 August 1987) is an Egyptian footballer (soccer) defender who plays for Biyala SC.

References

External links
 
 

1987 births
Living people
Egyptian footballers
Place of birth missing (living people)
Association football central defenders
El Raja SC players
Al Ittihad Alexandria Club players
Smouha SC players
Tanta SC players
Ghazl El Mahalla SC players
Egyptian Premier League players